Aleshire is an English surname. Notable people with the surname include:

James B. Aleshire (1856-1925), US Army major general
Arthur W. Aleshire (1900–1940), American politician
Lennie Aleshire (1890–1987), American vaudeville and country music performer
Sara B. Aleshire (1947-1997), American epigrapher and historian of Greek religion

English-language surnames